Chandra Prasad Giri (born May 13, 1961) is a Nepalese-American author, scientist, and businessman.  He specializes in remote sensing and sensor technologies in mapping and monitoring of land cover and mangrove forests. Giri is currently chief of the Sensing and Spatial Analysis branch of the United States Environmental Protection Agency and adjunct professor at Duke University in North Carolina. Prior to this, he worked as senior scientist at the United States Geological Survey, Columbia University, the Asian Institute of Technology, the United Nations Environment Programme, and the Nepal Government. Prior to this he worked as a school teacher at Dangi Secondary School, Dangihat, Morang, Nepal and Dhulabari Secondary School, Dhulabari, Jhapa, Nepal

His work produced the first, most comprehensive and highest resolution mangrove forest database of the world using earth observation satellite data at 30 meters spatial resolution. The overall goal of his research is to assess the present status and historical dynamics of land cover and land use to describe and quantify patterns, trends, rates, causes, and consequences of both natural and anthropogenic changes from local to global scales.

Early Life and education
Giri was born in an extremely remote village in the foothills of Mount Everest in Nepal. His parents were farmers in a rural village called Chimchima in the middle hills of Nepal. In the early years, he was raised by his grandfather Pratap Giri and his mother Rupa Giri.
He got his elementary education at home and from Patheka Elementary School, Khotang, Nepal. He went to Dhulabari Secondary High School for his high school (until grade X) education. After that Giri was educated in the Tribhuvan University campuses in Dharan, Biratgnagr, central campus Kirtipur, and Pokhara. Tribhuvan University was the only University in Nepal at that time. Giri completed his Intermediate in Science degree from the Central Campus of Technology, Dharan and Bachelor of Science from Mahendra Morang Adarsha Bahumukhi Campus in Biratnagar. Giri dropped out of his Masters degree in Physics from the central campus Kirtipur to join the forestry program. He did his Bachelor in Forestry from Institute of Forestry, Pokhara.  He was awarded a Masters (1993) and Ph.D. (1997) in Remote Sensing and GIS from the Asian Institute of Technology, Bangkok, Thailand.

Books 
He is also the author of the book Remote sensing of land use and land cover: Principles and Applications. The book became the best seller among remote sensing publications in 2012.

He has published a book on "Remote Sensing in Mangroves" in 2021.   

He has published an autobiography "Maile Nadekhekeko Sapana"(Unimagined Dream), Nepali edition  in December 2022 Amazon.com.

Research
Giri is an expert in the field of mapping and monitoring of mangrove forests. His work focuses on developing new methods to improve scientific understanding of the distribution and dynamics of land cover/mangrove forests.

His paper Giri et al. 2011 Status and distribution of mangrove forests of the world using earth observation satellite data became a classic paper with more than 3000 citations. The paper today is the most cited paper in the field of 'mangrove' and became the most cited paper annually from 2014 to 2021 in the field of 'remote sensing in mangroves'. 

Giri has led a number of international scientific working groups and deliberations including (i) Lead of the GEO working group in land cover, (ii) Lead of the working group on global mangrove monitoring, (iii) Co-lead, ISPRS working group on global land cover and (iv) founding member of the International Blue Carbon Scientific Working Group.

Giri is also an associate editor in various remote sensing journals including Remote Sensing.

Song writing
In 2019, Giri co-wrote a Nepali song entitled "timi suna na, timi bujha na" 

In March 2020, Giri co-wrote his second Nepali song entitled "Malai Pardeshi Nabhana"

In August 2020, Giri released his third Nepali song entitled "Nache Firiri"

In September, 2020, Giri released his fourth Nepali song (lyrical video) entitled "Sano ra thulo hudaina manchhe, hau hami barabar" 

In January, 2021 Giri released his fifth Nepali song entitled "Confuse Chhu"

In December, 2022, Chandra Giri released his sixth Nepali song entitled "Parkhi Baseko Chhu". In this song, Giri is the lyricist and music composer. The song is available through YouTube: https://www.youtube.com/watch?v=BZ9jr_BfMuM

In December, 2022, Chandra Giri released his 7th to 16th songs. These songs are available from his own channel Rupantara Music on YouTube https://www.youtube.com/watch?v=ftYMtqV2SEU

Personal Life 
Giri lives in Durham, North Carolina with his wife Tejaswi Giri, a Social Worker. His daughter Medhawi Giri is a US diplomat currently stationed in the US embassy, Dhaka, Bangladesh. His son is a lawyer who works for Legal Aid in North Carolina

Publications
List of his publication can be found at Chandra Giri in Google Scholar

Awards
He is a recipient of the Mahendra Vidya Bhushan of Nepal, awarded by the King of Nepal. He has received several awards and accolades including USGS STAR Award, Outstanding Researcher EPA, Distinguished Alumni Award AIT and People with Extraordinary Ability, USA

References

External links
Giri's research was highlighted by several news media including the following publications.
BBC Earth News Mangrove forest declines around world
NASA Landsat Science: Landsat Enables World's Most Comprehensive Mangrove Assessment
BioScience: Forests between the Tides: Conserving Earth's vanishing mangrove ecosystems
Public Radio International: Saved by the Mangroves? A Philippine town dodges Haiyan's storm surge
American Museum of Natural History:
Nature:'Blue carbon' plan takes shape
Science Daily
NASA Earth Observatory: Root of the Matter: A New Map Shows Life-Saving Forests’ Scarcity Defies Past Estimates
Live Science
Mongabay:
SatNews Daily:
Christian Science Monitor:

American people of Nepalese descent
Nepalese scientists
1961 births
Living people
People from Khotang District